Port Hedland International Airport  is an international airport serving Port Hedland, Western Australia. It is an important airport for passengers who work in the mining industry.

History
The airport has undergone a number of upgrades. Stage one of works include the extension of an existing taxiway and installation of new lighting, the construction of a new taxiway, widening of taxiway intersections and the extension of the domestic and international arrivals and departures area. This was to be completed by the end of July 2011. A further upgrade occurred in 2013.

Between 2008 and 2014, passenger movements more than doubled as a result of increased fly-in fly-out activity to the Pilbara during the mining boom.

Virgin Australia Regional Airlines previously operated flights to Denpasar which were suspended in 2014, the Denpasar flight resumed on 4 April 2015 and is operated by Virgin Australia.

In July 2015, the Town of Port Hedland agreed to lease the airport to AMP Capital and Infrastructure Capital Group for 50 years. The transaction is expected to be completed by the end of 2015.

Airlines and destinations

Statistics
Port Hedland International Airport was ranked 20th in Australia for the number of revenue passengers served in financial year 2014/15.

Operations

*Port Hedland-Perth route data only included from August 2009

See also
 List of airports in Western Australia
 Aviation transport in Australia

References

External links

Port Hedland Airport – official website
 Airservices Aerodromes & Procedure Charts

Port Hedland, Western Australia
Pilbara airports
International airports in Australia